Ablaberoides crassus is a species of beetles first discovered by Olof Immanuel von Fåhraeus in 1857. No sub-species are listed at the Catalogue of Life.

References

Melolonthinae
Beetles described in 1857